2009 Universiade may refer to:

2009 Summer Universiade, which was held in Belgrade, Serbia
2009 Winter Universiade, which was held in Harbin, China